Ebikewenimo Welson is a Nigerian freestyle wrestler. He is a four-time medalist at the Commonwealth Games and a two-time medalist at the African Games.

Career 

He won four medals at the Commonwealth Games: in 2010, he won the silver medal in the men's 55 kg event and he repeated this in 2014 with the silver medal in the men's 57 kg event. In 2018, he won one of the bronze medals in the men's 57 kg event. He won the silver medal in the men's 57 kg event at the 2022 Commonwealth Games.

He represented Nigeria at the 2019 African Games held in Rabat, Morocco and he won the silver medal in the men's 57 kg event.

He won the gold medal in the men's 57 kg event at the 2014 African Wrestling Championships and the silver medal in that event at the 2016 African Wrestling Championships. At the 2018 African Wrestling Championships held in Port Harcourt, Nigeria, he also won the silver medal in the men's 57 kg event. He was unable to compete at the 2019 African Wrestling Championships due to injury.

In 2021, he won a gold medal at the Baraza Champion of Champions wrestling tournament held in Yenagoa, Bayelsa State, Nigeria. A few months later, he competed at the 2021 African & Oceania Wrestling Olympic Qualification Tournament hoping to qualify for the 2020 Summer Olympics in Tokyo, Japan.

He won the silver medal in his event at the 2022 African Wrestling Championships held in El Jadida, Morocco. He won the silver medal in the men's 57 kg event at the 2022 Commonwealth Games held in Birmingham, England.

Achievements

References

External links 

 

Living people
Year of birth missing (living people)
Place of birth missing (living people)
Nigerian male sport wrestlers
Wrestlers at the 2010 Commonwealth Games
Wrestlers at the 2014 Commonwealth Games
Wrestlers at the 2018 Commonwealth Games
Wrestlers at the 2022 Commonwealth Games
Commonwealth Games medallists in wrestling
Commonwealth Games silver medallists for Nigeria
Commonwealth Games bronze medallists for Nigeria
African Games silver medalists for Nigeria
African Games medalists in wrestling
Competitors at the 2015 African Games
Competitors at the 2019 African Games
African Wrestling Championships medalists
21st-century Nigerian people
Medallists at the 2010 Commonwealth Games
Medallists at the 2014 Commonwealth Games
Medallists at the 2018 Commonwealth Games
Medallists at the 2022 Commonwealth Games